Andy Crawford was a Scottish footballer who broke through into the senior ranks with Dumbarton in the early 1960s.  After five seasons there he transferred to Morton and then to Berwick Rangers.

References

Scottish footballers
Arsenal F.C. players
Dumbarton F.C. players
Greenock Morton F.C. players
Berwick Rangers F.C. players
Scottish Football League players
Year of birth missing
Place of birth missing
Association football goalkeepers